Harvest Moon is a farm simulation role-playing video game series published by Natsume. The main objective of the games is to rebuild a run-down old farm and turn it into a successful one. The most recent game is Harvest Moon: One World, released in 2020.

Previously, Natsume published the series Bokujō Monogatari in North America under the title Harvest Moon.  In 2014, Marvelous, the developer and original publisher of the Bokujō Monogatari series, decided to have their own American division, Xseed Games, take over North American distribution. However, due to Natsume owning the rights to the Harvest Moon name, the latest titles in the series were rebranded Story of Seasons, while Natsume began to produce their own series under the Harvest Moon name.

Origins
Natsume initially distributed this series under the name Harvest Moon outside of Japan until 2014. At that time, Natsume maintained the rights to the Harvest Moon series name after Marvelous announced that it would have its subsidiary, Xseed Games, take over North American distribution. Because of this, Xseed began localizing the series to North America under the Story of Seasons title, beginning with the release of the game of the same name.

In 2007, Natsume took the opportunity to develop their own video game series using the name Harvest Moon in North America and Europe, and in 2014, it released Harvest Moon: The Lost Valley, the first farm simulator game in the new series. The resulting spin-off series, at least since Harvest Moon: The Lost Valley, has caused some degree of confusion among fans and video game news sources, due to the game not actually being a part of the same series as the games titled Harvest Moon before it.

List of games

Reception

Notes

References

External links

 Natsume official site
 

Natsume (company) games
Video game franchises
Video game franchises introduced in 2007